Giovanni Corbyons (born January 1, 1900 in Rome) was an Italian professional football player.

He played 2 games in the Serie A in the 1929/30 season for A.S. Roma.

1900 births
Year of death missing
Italian footballers
Serie A players
Serie B players
A.S. Roma players
ACF Fiorentina players
Catania S.S.D. players
Association football midfielders
S.E.F. Torres 1903 players